Toronto High School may refer to:

 Toronto Junior/Senior High School, a public secondary school in Toronto, Ohio, United States
 Toronto High School (New South Wales), a state school in Lake Macquarie, Australia

See also
 Education in Toronto, listing high schools in Ontario, Canada